Oswald Flemmer (7 January 1907 – 14 January 1962) was a South African cricketer. He played in twenty-four first-class matches from 1925/26 to 1934/35.

References

External links
 

1907 births
1962 deaths
South African cricketers
Border cricketers
Eastern Province cricketers
Cricketers from East London, Eastern Cape